Dione Alex Veroneze (born 16 December 1990), known as Bateria, is a Brazilian futsal player who plays for Viña Albali Valdepeñas and the Brazilian national futsal team as a winger.

References

External links
Liga Nacional Fútbol Sala profile

1996 births
Living people
Brazilian men's futsal players
Inter FS players
FC Barcelona Futsal players
FS Cartagena players